Jyotish Mitter (April 1926 – 29 June 1971) was an Indian cricketer. He played six first-class matches for Bengal between 1950 and 1959.

See also
 List of Bengal cricketers

References

External links
 

1926 births
1971 deaths
Indian cricketers
Bengal cricketers
Cricketers from Kolkata